Sericostola semibrunnea is a species of sedge moth in the genus Sericostola. It was described by John B. Heppner in 1990. It is found in Costa Rica.

References

Moths described in 1990
Glyphipterigidae